"Small Town Throwdown" is a song co-written and recorded by American country rock singer Brantley Gilbert as a collaboration with Justin Moore and Thomas Rhett. It was released in May 2014 as the second single from his third studio album Just as I Am. The song has sold 417,000 copies in the U.S. as of October 2014.

Critical reception
An uncredited Taste of Country review stated that "The song — penned by Gilbert and the Peach Pickers — is built to be performed live. Raw energy will make it a hit, as the four aren’t breaking new ground lyrically. For all the talk of a more sentimental album after one or two high-profile news events in Gilbert’s life, the first two singles seem to introduce a very loud, rebellious record. That’s likely a relief to fans who save money all year to see him take the stage."

Music video
The music video was directed by Shane Drake and premiered in August 2014. UFC Hall of Famer Chuck Liddell plays a supporting role as the boss from hell.

Chart performance

Year-end charts

Certifications

References

2014 songs
2014 singles
Brantley Gilbert songs
Justin Moore songs
Thomas Rhett songs
Songs written by Brantley Gilbert
Songs written by The Peach Pickers
Song recordings produced by Dann Huff
Big Machine Records singles
Music videos directed by Shane Drake
Vocal collaborations